Chandel (Vidhan Sabha constituency) is one of the 60 Vidhan Sabha constituencies in the Indian state of Manipur.

Members of Legislative Assembly 
 1972: H. T. Thungam, Independent
 1974: H. T. Thungam, Manipur Hills Union
 1980: Satkholal, KNA
 1984: H. T. Thungam, Independent
 1990: B. D. Behring, Janata Dal
 1995: Hangkhanpao, Janata Dal
 2000: Hangkhanpao, Rashtriya Janata Dal
 2002: B. D. Behring, Bharatiya Janata Party
 2007: Thangkholun Haokip, Rashtriya Janata Dal
 2012: St. Nunghlung Victor, Naga People's Front
 2017: Letpao Haokip,  National People's Party

Election results

2017

See also
Manipur Legislative Assembly
List of constituencies of Manipur Legislative Assembly
 Chandel district

References

External link
 

Assembly constituencies of Manipur
Chandel district